is a Japanese football player for Nankatsu SC.

Club statistics
.

Reserves performance

References

External links

Profile at Nankatsu SC

1994 births
Living people
Association football people from Osaka Prefecture
Japanese footballers
J1 League players
J2 League players
J3 League players
Cerezo Osaka players
Cerezo Osaka U-23 players
Ehime FC players
Montedio Yamagata players
Gainare Tottori players
Nankatsu SC players
J.League U-22 Selection players
Association football midfielders
People from Fujiidera, Osaka